Bankes is an English surname that may refer to the following people:
Bankes family of prominent gentry in Dorset, England
Anne Bankes (1759–1778), English pastellist
Charlotte Bankes (born 1995), British-French snowboarder
Edward Bankes, Irish-born American entrepreneur, founder of Bankes Coffee Stores
John Eldon Bankes (1854–1946), Welsh judge 
Lyn Bankes (born 1941), American politician
Peter Bankes, English football referee
William Bankes (disambiguation), multiple people

See also
Banks (surname)

English-language surnames